While many medals have been issued by the government of France over the centuries, legal tender commemorative coinage only began in 1982, with the issue of ten-franc piece commemorating Léon Gambetta. Soon there were other issues, and by the 1990s, there was a profusion of silver coins commemorating many events.

Recent issues
 1.50 euro - silver - Cinderella - 2002
 1.50 euro - silver - Snow White - 2002
 1.50 euro - silver - Alice in Wonderland - 2003
 1.50 euro - silver - Hansel and Gretel - 2003
 1.50 euro - silver - Aladdin - 2004
 1.50 euro - silver - Peter Pan - 2004
 1.50 euro - silver - 60th anniversary of D-Day - 2004
 10 euro - gold - FIFA centennial - 2004
 1.50 euro - silver - FIFA centennial - 2004
 10 euro - gold - 150th anniversary of Bordeaux wines - 2005
 1.50 euro - silver - 150th anniversary of Bordeaux Wines - 2005
 1.50 euro - silver - 60th anniversary of World War II - 2005
 10 euro - gold - Bicentenary of Austerlitz - 2005
 1.50 - silver - Europa - 2005
 1.50 euro - silver - Frédéric Chopin - 2005
 20 euro - silver - Jules Verne/Twenty Thousand Leagues Under the Sea - 2005
 0.25 euro - base metal - Jules Verne/Monde Fantastique - 2005
 1.50 euro - silver - The Sower/Le Semeuse - 2005
 20 euro - gold - 120th anniversary of the Statue of Liberty - 2004
 100 euro - gold - 120th anniversary of the Statue of Liberty - 2004
 1.50 euro - silver - 120th anniversary of the Statue of Liberty - 2004
 1.50 euro - silver - Avignon and the Palaces of the Popes - 2004
 10 euro - gold - Bicentennial of Napoleon's coronation - 2004?
 0.25 euro - silver - Europa - 2003
 10 euro - gold - Europa - 2004
 1.50 euro - silver - FIFA centennial - 2004
 20 euro - silver - Jules Verne/Around the World in Eighty Days - 2005
 20 euro - gold - "Château de Chambord" - 2003
 1.50 euro - silver - World Athletic Championships (WAC)/Jumping - 2003
 1.50 euro - silver - WAC/Throwing - 2003
 20 euro - gold - Paris-Tokyo flight - 2003
 20 euro - gold - The Normandie - 2003
 1.50 euro - silver - The Normandie - 2003
 20 euro - gold - The Orient Express - 2003
 1.50 euro - silver - Messageries Maritimes - 2004
 1.50 euro - silver - The Grands Express Aériens - 2004
 1.50 euro - silver - Yellow Cruise Half-Track - 2004
 20 euro - gold - D-Day Anniversary - 2004
 50 euro - gold - Hello Kitty/"Versailles Debut" - 2005
 10 euro - gold - Hello Kitty/"Kitty Becomes an Opera Singer" - 2005
 1.50 euro - silver - Hello Kitty/"Life In Paris" series of 3 - 2005
 1.50 euro – silver - 100th Anniversary of the French Automobile Club 1st Grand Prix    - 

France
France history-related lists
Coins of France